Protodrilida is an order of polychaetes belonging to the class Polychaeta.

Families:
 Protodrilidae Czerniavsky, 1881
 Protodriloididae Purschke & Jouin, 1988

References

Polychaetes